Rhizoplaca shushanii is a species of crustose lichen in the  family Lecanoraceae.

References

Further reading

Kondratyuk, S. Y., et al. "Molecular phylogeny of placodioid lichen-forming fungi reveal a new genus, Sedelnikovaea." Mycotaxon 129.2 (2015): 269–282.
Leavitt, Steven D., et al. "Resolving evolutionary relationships in lichen-forming fungi using diverse phylogenomic datasets and analytical approaches." Scientific reports 6 (2016).

Lecanoraceae
Lichen species
Lichens described in 2013
Taxa named by Helge Thorsten Lumbsch